Rhagium fasciculatum is a species of beetle in the family Cerambycidae. It was described by Faldermann in 1837.

References

Lepturinae
Beetles described in 1837